Harry James Potter  is a fictional character and the titular protagonist in J. K. Rowling's series of eponymous novels. The majority of the books' plot covers seven years in the life of the orphan Harry, who, on his eleventh birthday, learns he is a wizard. Thus, he attends Hogwarts to practise magic under the guidance of the kindly headmaster Albus Dumbledore and other school professors along with his best friends Ron Weasley and Hermione Granger. Harry also discovers that he is already famous throughout the novel's magical community, and that his fate is tied with that of Lord Voldemort – the internationally feared Dark Wizard and murderer of his parents, James and Lily Potter. The book and film series revolve around Harry's struggle to adapt to the wizarding world and defeat Voldemort.

Harry is regarded as a fictional icon and has been described by many critics, readers, and audiences as one of the greatest literary and film characters of all time. He is portrayed by Daniel Radcliffe in all eight Harry Potter films from Philosopher's Stone (2001) to Deathly Hallows – Part 2 (2011).

Concept and creation
According to Rowling, the idea for both the Harry Potter books and its eponymous character came while waiting for a delayed train from Manchester, England to London in 1990. She stated that the idea of "this scrawny, black-haired, bespectacled boy who didn't know he was a wizard became more and more real to me". While developing the ideas for her book, she also decided to make Harry an orphan who attended a boarding school called Hogwarts. She explained in a 1999 interview with The Guardian: "Harry had to be an orphan—so that he's a free agent, with no fear of letting down his parents, disappointing them ... Hogwarts has to be a boarding school—half the important stuff happens at night! Then there's the security. Having a child of my own reinforces my belief that children above all want security, and that's what Hogwarts offers Harry."

Her own mother's death on 30 December 1990 inspired Rowling to write Harry as a boy longing for his dead parents, his anguish becoming "much deeper, much more real" than in earlier drafts because she related to it herself. In a 2000 interview with The Guardian, Rowling also established that the character of Wart in T. H. White's novel The Once and Future King is "Harry's spiritual ancestor". Finally, she established Harry's birth date as 31 July, the same as her own. However, she maintained that Harry was not directly based on any real-life person: "he came just out of a part of me".

Rowling has also maintained that Harry is a suitable real-life role model for children. "The advantage of a fictional hero or heroine is that you can know them better than you can know a living hero, many of whom you would never meet ... if people like Harry and identify with him, I am pleased, because I think he is very likeable."

Appearances

Harry Potter and the Philosopher's Stone 
Harry is an orphan living with his abusive aunt and uncle, Vernon and Petunia Dursley and their bullying son, Dudley. On his eleventh birthday, Harry discovers he is a wizard when Rubeus Hagrid delivers him an acceptance letter to Hogwarts School of Witchcraft and Wizardry. He learns that his parents, James and Lily Potter, were murdered by a powerful dark wizard, Lord Voldemort. Harry, instead, survived Voldemort's killing curse, which ended up bouncing back and apparently killing Voldemort, leaving a lightning bolt shaped scar on his forehead. Thus Harry became famous in the wizarding world. 

Hagrid takes Harry to Diagon Alley to shop for his school supplies. He gifts Harry an owl that he names Hedwig, while Harry buys his very first wand at Ollivanders. The owner reveals to him that the cores of Harry and Lord Voldemort's wands have feathers from the same phoenix bird, establishing a powerful connection between the two. At the end of the summer, Harry boards the Hogwarts Express, where he befriends Ronald Weasley and meets Hermione Granger, who both him and Ron initially dislike. Upon his arrival at Hogwarts, Harry is sorted into Gryffindor House after begging the Sorting Hat not to put him in Slytherin House. He finds mentors in Transfiguration professor and head of Gryffindor Minerva McGonagall and headmaster Albus Dumbledore, whereas he forms a rivalry with Draco Malfoy, a classmate from an elitist wizarding family, and the condescending Potions master, Severus Snape, Draco's mentor and the head of Slytherin House. Following an unfortunate accident during his Flying class, Harry becomes the youngest Seeker on the Gryffindor Quidditch team in a century. Harry and Ron are tricked by Malfoy into leaving their dorms at night and Hermione follows them. While trying to hide, they come across a gigantic three-headed dog guarding a trapdoor. The three finally become best friends when Harry and Ron save Hermione from a troll. During Christmas holidays, Harry receives an anonymous gift – his father's invisibility cloak. Aided by the cloak, he is able to explore the school undisturbed. On one of his nightly trips, he sees his parents in an abandoned mirror. It is the Mirror of Erised, which shows what the viewer most desires.

Professor Snape's behavior and leg injury arouse the suspicion of Harry, Ron and Hermione, who believe he is attempting to enter the trapdoor. After Harry loses control of his broomstick, Hermione thinks Snape has jinxed Harry's broom. News arrives that someone attempted to rob the same Gringotts Bank's vault from which Hagrid had previously retrieved an item on Dumbledore's orders. Harry and his friends suspect it is the same object as the one beneath the trapdoor, which they identify with the philosopher's stone. Harry and his friends decide to descend through the trapdoor to protect the stone, but they are presented with a series of obstacles and Ron and Hermione are forced to remain behind. Harry faces the Defence Against the Dark Arts professor, Quirinus Quirrell, who reveals he was behind all the difficulties they encountered throughout the school year. Voldemort now inhabits Quirrell's body and is trying to obtain the philosopher's stone, hidden in the Mirror of Erised. The mirror recognises Harry's lack of greed for the stone and deposits it into his pocket, but Quirrell soon discovers it and tries to snatch it from Harry. The professor attempts to kill him. However, his flesh burns upon contact with Harry's skin. Harry's scar begins hurting and he passes out.

Harry awakens in the school's infirmary, where Dumbledore explains how Harry originally survived Voldemort. His mother's sacrifice created a magical protection for him, which also acted against and killed Professor Quirrell. Voldemort unfortunately survived, while the philosopher's stone has been destroyed to prevent it being stolen. During the school's year-end feast, Gryffindor is awarded the House Cup thanks to the many points Harry and his friends obtained with their adventure. Harry returns to the Dursleys for the summer.

Harry Potter and the Chamber of Secrets 
In the second book, Harry Potter and the Chamber of Secrets, Rowling pits Harry against Tom Riddle, Lord Voldemort's "memory" within a secret diary which has possessed Ron's younger sister Ginny. When Muggle-born students are suddenly being Petrified, many suspect that Harry may be behind the attacks, further alienating him from his peers. Furthermore, Harry begins to doubt his worthiness for House of Gryffindor, particularly considering he discovers he shares Lord Voldemort's ability to communicate with snakes via Parseltongue. In the climax, Ginny disappears. To rescue her, Harry battles Riddle and the monster he controls that is hidden in the Chamber of Secrets. To defeat the monster, Harry summons the Sword of Godric Gryffindor from the Sorting Hat supplied by Dumbledore's pet phoenix, Fawkes. In doing so, Dumbledore later restores Harry's self-esteem by explaining that that feat is clear proof of his worthiness of his present house.

Harry Potter and the Prisoner of Azkaban 
In the third book, Harry Potter and the Prisoner of Azkaban, Rowling uses a time travel premise. Harry learns that his parents were betrayed to Voldemort by their friend Peter Pettigrew, who framed Harry's godfather Sirius Black for the crimes, condemning him to Azkaban, the wizard prison. When Sirius escapes to find Harry, Harry and Hermione use a Time Turner to save him and a hippogriff named Buckbeak. When Pettigrew escapes, an innocent Sirius becomes a hunted fugitive once again. Harry learns how to create a Patronus, which takes the form of a stag, the same as his late father's.

Harry Potter and the Goblet of Fire 
In the previous books, Harry is written as a child, but Rowling states that in the fourth novel, Harry Potter and the Goblet of Fire, "Harry's horizons are literally and metaphorically widening as he grows older." Harry's developing maturity becomes apparent when he becomes romantically interested in Cho Chang, a student in Ravenclaw house. Tension mounts, however, when Harry is mysteriously chosen by the Goblet of Fire to compete in the dangerous Triwizard Tournament, even though another Hogwarts champion, Cedric Diggory, has already been selected. Voldemort uses the Tournament for an elaborate scheme to lure Harry into a deadly trap. During the Tournament's final challenge, Harry and Cedric are transported to a graveyard, using a portkey, where Cedric is killed by Peter Pettigrew, and Voldemort, aided by Pettigrew, uses Harry's blood in a gruesome ritual to resurrect his body. When Harry duels Voldemort, their wands' magical streams connect, forcing the spirit echoes of Voldemort's victims, including Cedric and James and Lily Potter, to be expelled from his wand. The spirits briefly protect Harry as he escapes to Hogwarts with Cedric's body. For Rowling, this scene is important because it shows Harry's bravery, and by retrieving Cedric's corpse, he demonstrates selflessness and compassion. Says Rowling, "He wants to save Cedric's parents additional pain." She added that preventing Cedric's body from falling into Voldemort's hands is based on the classic scene in the Iliad where Achilles retrieves the body of his best friend Patroclus from the hands of Hector. Rowling also mentioned that book four rounds off an era in Harry's life, and the remaining three books are another, "He's no longer protected. He's been very protected until now. But he's very young to have that experience. Most of us don't get that until a bit later in life. He's only just coming up to 15 and that's it now."

Harry Potter and the Order of the Phoenix 
In the fifth book, Harry Potter and the Order of the Phoenix, the Ministry of Magic has been waging a smear campaign against Harry and Dumbledore, disputing their claims that Voldemort has returned. Harry is made to look like an attention-seeking liar, and Dumbledore a trouble-maker. A new character is introduced when the Ministry of Magic appoints Dolores Umbridge as the latest Hogwarts' Defence Against the Dark Arts instructor (and Ministry spy). Because the paranoid Ministry suspects that Dumbledore is building a wizard army to overthrow them, Umbridge refuses to teach students real defensive magic. She gradually gains more power, eventually ousting Dumbledore and seizing control of the school. As a result, Harry's increasingly angry and erratic behaviour nearly estranges him from Ron and Hermione.

Rowling says she put Harry through extreme emotional stress to show his emotional vulnerability and humanity—a contrast to his nemesis, Voldemort. "[Harry is] a very human hero, and this is, obviously, a contrast, between him, as a very human hero, and Voldemort, who has deliberately dehumanised himself. And Harry, therefore, did have to reach a point where he did almost break down, and say he didn't want to play any more, he didn't want to be the hero any more – and he'd lost too much. And he didn't want to lose anything else. So that – Phoenix was the point at which I decided he would have his breakdown."

At Hermione's urging, Harry forms a secret student organisation called Dumbledore's Army to teach more meaningful defence against the dark arts as Professor Umbridge is making them read off a textbook. Their plan is thwarted, however, when a Dumbledore's Army member, Marietta Edgecombe, betrays them and informs Umbridge about the D.A., causing Dumbledore to be ousted as Headmaster. Harry suffers another emotional blow, when his beloved godfather, Sirius, is killed during a duel with Sirius' cousin, the Death Eater Bellatrix Lestrange, at the Department of Mysteries, but Harry ultimately defeats Voldemort's plan to steal an important prophecy. Rowling stated: "And now he [Harry] will rise from the ashes strengthened." A side plot of Order of the Phoenix involves Harry's romance with Cho Chang, but the relationship quickly unravels. Says Rowling: "They were never going to be happy, it was better that it ended early!"

Harry Potter and the Half-Blood Prince 
In the sixth book, Harry Potter and the Half-Blood Prince, Harry enters a tumultuous puberty that, Rowling says, is based on her and her younger sister's own difficult teenage years. Rowling also made an intimate statement about Harry's personal life: "Because of the demands of the adventure that Harry is following, he has had less sexual experience than boys of his age might have had." This inexperience with romance was a factor in Harry's failed relationship with Cho. Now his thoughts concern Ginny, and a vital plot point in the last chapter includes Harry ending their budding romance to protect her from Voldemort.

A new character appears when former Hogwarts Potions master Horace Slughorn replaces Snape, who assumes the Defence Against the Dark Arts post. Harry suddenly excels in Potions, using an old textbook once belonging to a talented student known only as "The Half-Blood Prince". The book contains many handwritten notes, revisions, and new spells; Hermione, however, believes Harry's use of it is cheating. Through private meetings with Dumbledore, Harry learns about Voldemort's orphaned youth, his rise to power, and how he splintered his soul into Horcruxes to achieve immortality. Two Horcruxes have been destroyed—the diary and a ring; and Harry and Dumbledore locate another, although it is a fake. When Death Eaters invade Hogwarts, Snape kills Dumbledore. As Snape escapes, he proclaims that he is the Half-Blood Prince (being the son of a muggle father and the pure-blood Eileen Prince). It now falls upon Harry to find and destroy Voldemort's remaining Horcruxes and to avenge Dumbledore's death. In a 2005 interview, Rowling stated that [after the events in the sixth book] Harry has, "taken the view that they are now at war. He does become more battle-hardened. He's now ready to go out fighting. And he's after revenge [against Voldemort and Snape]."

This book also focuses  on the mysterious activities of Harry's rival Draco Malfoy. Voldemort has coerced a frightened Malfoy into attempting to kill Dumbledore. During a duel in Moaning Myrtle's bathroom, Harry uses the Half-Blood Prince's spell, Sectumsempra, on Malfoy, who suffers near-fatal injuries as a result. Harry is horrified by what he has done and also comes to feel sympathy for Draco, after learning he was forced to do Voldemort's bidding under the threat of his and his parents' deaths.

Harry Potter and the Deathly Hallows 
In Harry Potter and the Deathly Hallows, Harry, Ron, and Hermione leave Hogwarts to complete Dumbledore's task: to search for and destroy Voldemort's remaining four Horcruxes, then find and kill the Dark Lord. The three pit themselves against Voldemort's newly formed totalitarian police state, an action that tests Harry's courage and moral character. Voldemort's seizure of the Ministry of Magic leads to discriminatory and genocidal policies against Muggle-borns, fuelled by propaganda and fear. According to J. K. Rowling, telling scenes are when Harry uses Cruciatus Curse and Imperius Curse, unforgivable curses for torture and mind-control, on Voldemort's servants, and also when he casts Sectumsempra on Draco Malfoy during the bathroom fight in the sixth book. Each time shows a "flawed and mortal" side to Harry. However, she explains, "He is also in an extreme situation and attempting to defend somebody very good against a violent and murderous opponent."

Harry experiences occasional disturbing visions of Draco being forced to perform the Death Eaters' bidding and feels "sickened ... by the use to which Draco was now being put by Voldemort", again showing his compassion for an enemy.

Each Horcrux Harry must defeat cannot be destroyed easily. They must be destroyed with basilisk venom, Godric Gryffindor's sword, or some other destructive substance. In Book Two, Harry destroys the first horcrux, Tom Riddle's diary, with a basilisk fang, and in Book Six Dumbledore destroys the ring with Gryffindor's sword. Ron destroys Slytherin's locket with the sword, Hermione destroys Hufflepuff's cup with a basilisk fang, and Crabbe destroys Ravenclaw's diadem with Fiendfyre (cursed flame). Neville kills the snake Nagini with the sword, and Voldemort destroys the final accidental Horcrux: a fragment of soul embedded in Harry's scar.

Harry comes to recognise that his own single-mindedness makes him predictable to his enemies and often clouds his perceptions. When Voldemort kills Snape later in the story, Harry discovers that Snape was not the traitorous murderer he believed him to be, but a tragic antihero who was loyal to Dumbledore. In Chapter 33 ('The Prince's Tale') Snape's memories reveal that he loved Harry's mother Lily, but their friendship ended over his association with future Death Eaters and his "blood purity" beliefs. When Voldemort murdered the Potters, a grieving Snape vowed to protect Lily's child, although he loathed young Harry for being James Potter's son. The memories also reveal that Snape did not murder Dumbledore, but carried out Dumbledore's prearranged plan. Dumbledore, dying from a slow-spreading curse, wanted to protect Snape's position within the Death Eaters and to spare Draco from completing Voldemort's task of murdering him.

To defeat Harry, Voldemort steals the most powerful wand ever created, the Elder Wand, from Dumbledore's tomb and twice casts the Killing Curse on Harry with it. The first attempt merely stuns Harry into a deathlike state; the murder attempt fails because Voldemort used Harry's blood in his resurrection during book four. The protection that his mother gave Harry with her sacrifice tethers Harry to life, as long as his blood and her sacrifice run in the veins of Voldemort. In the chapter "King's Cross", Dumbledore's spirit talks to Harry whilst in this deathlike state. Dumbledore informs Harry that when Voldemort disembodied himself during his failed attempt to kill Harry as a baby, Harry became an unintentional Horcrux; Harry could not kill Voldemort while the Dark Lord's soul shard remained within Harry's body. The piece of Voldemort's soul within Harry was destroyed through Voldemort's first killing curse with the Elder Wand because Harry willingly faced death, which cast a sacrificial protection on the defenders of Hogwarts.

In the book's climax, Voldemort's second Killing Curse hurled at Harry also fails and rebounds upon Voldemort, finally killing him. The spell fails because Harry, not Voldemort, had become the Elder Wand's true master and the wand could not harm its own master. Harry has each of the Hallows (the Invisibility Cloak, the Resurrection Stone, and the Elder Wand) at some point in the story but never unites them. However, J. K. Rowling said the difference between Harry and Voldemort is that Harry willingly accepts mortality, making him stronger than his nemesis. "The real master of Death accepts that he must die, and that there are much worse things in the world of the living." At the very end, Harry decides to leave the Elder Wand in Dumbledore's tomb and the Resurrection Stone hidden in the forest, but he keeps the Invisibility Cloak because it had belonged to his father.

In the epilogue of Deathly Hallows, which is set 19 years after Voldemort's death, Harry and Ginny are a couple and have three children: James Sirius Potter, who has already been at Hogwarts for at least one year, Albus Severus Potter, who is starting his first year there, and Lily Luna Potter, who is two years away from her first year at the school. According to Rowling, after Voldemort's defeat, Harry joins the "reshuffled" Auror Department under Kingsley Shacklebolt's mentoring, and ends up eventually rising to become Head of said department in 2007. Rowling said that his old rival Draco has a grudging gratitude towards Harry for saving his life in the final battle, but the two are not friends.

Film appearances
In the eight Harry Potter films screened from 2001 to 2011, Harry Potter was portrayed by British actor Daniel Radcliffe. Radcliffe was asked to audition for the role of Harry in 2000 by producer David Heyman, while in attendance at a play titled Stones in His Pockets in London.

In a 2007 interview with MTV, Radcliffe stated that, for him, Harry is a classic coming of age character: "That's what the films are about for me: a loss of innocence, going from being a young kid in awe of the world around him, to someone who is more battle-hardened by the end of it." He also said that for him, important factors in Harry's psyche are his survivor's guilt in regard to his deceased parents and his lingering loneliness. Because of this, Radcliffe talked to a bereavement counsellor to help him prepare for the role. Radcliffe was quoted as saying that he wished for Harry to die in the books, but he clarified that he "can't imagine any other way they can be concluded". After reading the last book, where Harry and his friends do indeed survive and have children, Radcliffe stated he was glad about the ending and lauded Rowling for the conclusion of the story. Radcliffe stated that the most repeated question he has been asked is how Harry Potter has influenced his own life, to which he regularly answers it has been "fine", and that he did not feel pigeonholed by the role, but rather sees it as a huge privilege to portray Harry.

Radcliffe's Harry was named the 36th greatest movie character of all time in 2011, and 67th in 2018 by Empire.

Appearance in other material
In Harry Potter and the Cursed Child, Harry appears again with his son Albus Severus, who was one of the two main protagonists of the series with Draco's son Scorpius.

Characterisation

Outward appearance
Throughout the series, Harry is described as having his father's perpetually untidy black hair, his mother's bright green eyes, and a lightning bolt-shaped scar on his forehead. He is further described as "small and skinny for his age" with "a thin face" and "knobbly knees", and he wears Windsor glasses. In the first book, his scar is described as "the only thing Harry liked about his own appearance". When asked about the meaning behind Harry's lightning bolt scar, Rowling said, "I wanted him to be physically marked by what he has been through. It was an outward expression of what he has been through inside ... It is almost like being the chosen one or the cursed one, in a sense."
Rowling has also stated that Harry inherited his parents' good looks. In the later part of the series Harry grows taller, and by the seventh book is said to be 'almost' the height of his father, and 'tall' by other characters.

Rowling explained that Harry's image came to her when she first thought up Harry Potter, seeing him as a "scrawny, black-haired, bespectacled boy". She also mentioned that she thinks Harry's glasses are the clue to his vulnerability.

Personality
According to Rowling, Harry is strongly guided by his own conscience, and has a keen feeling of what is right and wrong. Having "very limited access to truly caring adults", Rowling said, Harry "is forced, for such a young person, to make his own choices". He "does make mistakes", she conceded, but in the end, he does what his conscience tells him to do. According to Rowling, one of Harry's pivotal scenes came in the fourth book when he protects his dead schoolmate Cedric Diggory's body from Voldemort, because it shows he is brave and selfless.

Rowling has stated that Harry's character flaws include anger and impulsiveness; however, Harry is also innately honourable. "He's not a cruel boy. He's competitive, and he's a fighter. He doesn't just lie down and take abuse. But he does have native integrity, which makes him a hero to me. He's a normal boy but with those qualities most of us really admire." For the most part, Harry shows humility and modesty, often downplaying his achievements; though he uses a litany of his adventures as examples of his maturity early in the fifth book. However, these very same accomplishments are later employed to explain why he should lead Dumbledore's Army, at which point he asserts them as having just been luck, and denies that they make him worthy of authority. After the seventh book, Rowling commented that Harry has the ultimate character strength, which not even Voldemort possesses: the acceptance of the inevitability of death.

Magical abilities and skills

Throughout the series, Harry Potter is described as a gifted wizard apprentice. He has a particular talent for flying, which manifests itself in Harry Potter and the Philosopher's Stone the first time he tries it, and gets him a place on a Quidditch team one year before the normal minimum joining age.  He captains it in his sixth year.  In his fourth year (Harry Potter and the Goblet of Fire), Harry is able to confront a dragon on his broomstick.

Harry is also gifted in Defence Against the Dark Arts, in which he becomes proficient due to his repeated encounters with Voldemort and various monsters.  In his third year, Harry becomes able to cast the very advanced Patronus Charm, and by his fifth year he has become so talented at the subject that he is able to teach his fellow students in Dumbledore's Army, some even older than him how to defend themselves against Dark Magic.  At the end of that year, he achieves an 'Outstanding' Defence Against the Dark Arts O.W.L., something that not even Hermione achieved.  He is a skilled duellist, the only one of the six Dumbledore's Army members to be neither injured nor incapacitated during the battle with Death Eaters in the Department of Mysteries in [Harry Potter and the Order of the Phoenix.  He also fends off numerous Death Eaters during his flight to the Burrow at the beginning of Harry Potter and the Deathly Hallows.

Harry also had the unusual ability to speak and understand "Parseltongue", a language associated with Dark Magic.  This, it transpires, is because he harbours a piece of Voldemort's soul. He loses this ability after the part of Voldemort's soul inside him is destroyed at the end of The Deathly Hallows. However, in the events of Harry Potter and the Cursed Child, it was revealed that he had not lost the ability to recognise or speak the language when he encountered Delphini, Voldemort's daughter, who was trying to use his son and Draco Malfoy's son Scorpius to fulfill a prophecy that could guarantee the return of Voldemort by changing time.

Possessions
Harry's parents left behind a somewhat large pile of wizard's gold, used as currency in the world of magic, in a vault in the wizarding bank, Gringotts. After Sirius' death later in the series, all of his remaining possessions are also passed along to Harry, including Number Twelve, Grimmauld Place, and Sirius's vast amount of gold were transferred into Harry's account at Gringotts.

Among the school items Harry purchases in Diagon Alley after discovering his gold inheritance is his first wand, an 11-inch-long holly and phoenix feather model that he learns is the twin of Voldemort's wand, as the feathers that both wands contain as their cores both comes from Fawkes, the phoenix that Dumbledore keeps as a pet in his office until his death in Half-Blood Prince. Harry's wand is broken in Deathly Hallows. For a time, he borrows Hermione's wand, and later steals Draco's. With his defeat of Voldemort at the end of the series, he comes into the possession of the Elder Wand, but uses it only to repair his holly wand, before returning it to Dumbledore's tomb, from which Voldemort had stolen it. In the film version of Deathly Hallows Part 2, Harry destroys the Elder Wand.

Harry also inherits indirectly two of his father's prized possessions. One is the Marauder's Map, given to him by interim owners Fred and George Weasley, which endows Harry with comprehensive knowledge of Hogwarts' facilities, grounds, and occupants. The other is his father's invisibility cloak, given to him by Dumbledore, which eventually proves Harry's descent from the Peverell family. Harry uses these tools both to aid in excursions at school and to protect those he cares about; the Invisibility Cloak, in particular, can hide two full-grown people. If three fully-grown people hide under the cloak their feet will be visible. When Harry reaches his age of maturity at seventeen, Molly Weasley gives him a pocket watch which had once belonged to her brother Fabian Prewett, as it is traditional to give a boy a watch when he turns seventeen.

Throughout the majority of the books, Harry also has a pet owl named Hedwig, used to deliver and receive messages and packages. Hedwig is killed in the seventh book, about which Rowling says: "The loss of Hedwig represented a loss of innocence and security. She has been almost like a cuddly toy to Harry at times. I know that death upset a lot of people!" As a Quidditch player, Harry has owned two high-quality brooms. The first, a Nimbus Two Thousand, was procured for him by Professor Minerva McGonagall when Harry was added to Gryffindor's Quidditch team despite being a first-year student. This broom was destroyed by the Whomping Willow during a match in Harry's third year. It was replaced by a Firebolt, an even faster (and more expensive) broom, purchased for Harry by Sirius; however, as Sirius was believed to be trying to murder Harry at the time, the broom was subjected to stringent security inspections before Harry was allowed to ride it. Harry used it throughout his Hogwarts career until it, along with Hedwig, was lost during the July escape from Privet Drive in the final book.

Harry also owns a moleskin pouch, or small 'bag' that is used for storing items, which no one but the owner can get out. He receives this from Hagrid as a 17th birthday present. Harry uses the pouch throughout the course of Deathly Hallows to keep several sentimental (yet, as he himself admits, otherwise worthless) objects such as the Marauder's Map, a shard of the magical mirror given to him by his god-father Sirius, the fake Horcrux locket that had belonged to Sirius's brother R.A.B. (Regulus Arcturus Black), the Snitch bequeathed to him by Dumbledore, containing the Resurrection Stone that had previously been set into Voldemort's grandfather Marvolo Gaunt's signet ring, which Harry discovers is actually the second Hallow, a letter from his mother to Sirius with part of a photo (of him and his father, James), and eventually, his own broken wand (which Harry later repairs with the Elder Wand).

Family

In the novels, Harry is the only child of James and Lily Potter, orphaned as an infant. Rowling made Harry an orphan from the early drafts of her first book. She felt an orphan would be the most interesting character to write about. However, after her mother's death, Rowling wrote Harry as a child longing to see his dead parents again, incorporating her own anguish into him. Harry is categorised as a "half-blood" wizard in the series, because although both his parents were magical, Lily was "Muggle-born", and James was a pure-blood.

Harry's aunt and uncle kept the truth about his parents' deaths from Harry, telling him that they had died in a car crash. James Potter is a descendant of Ignotus Peverell, the third of the three original owners of the Deathly Hallows, and thus so is Harry, a realisation he makes during the course of the final book. The lineage continues at the end of the saga through his three children with Ginny: James Sirius Potter, Albus Severus Potter and Lily Luna Potter.

In an original piece published on the Pottermore website in September 2015, Rowling described the history of the Potter family in greater detail, beginning with the 12th-century wizard Linfred of Stinchcombe, "a locally well-beloved and eccentric man, whose nickname, 'the Potterer', became corrupted in time to 'Potter'". Linfred was the inventor of a number of remedies that evolved into potions still used in the modern day, including Skele-Gro and Pepperup Potion. These successful products garnered Linfred the earnings that formed the basis of the family's wealth, which grew with the work of successive generations. Linfred's oldest son, Hardwin, married a beautiful young witch from Godric's Hollow named Iolanthe Peverell, the granddaughter of Ignotus Peverell, who continued the tradition of passing down Ignotus' Invisibility Cloak through the generations. Two of Harry Potter's ancestors have sat on the Wizengamot: Ralston Potter and Henry Potter. Ralston was a member from 1612–1652, and an ardent supporter of the Statute of Secrecy. Henry Potter, known as "Harry" to his closest loved ones, was a direct descendant of Hardwin and Iolanthe, and a paternal great-grandfather of Harry Potter. Henry served on the Wizengamot from 1913–1921, and caused a minor controversy when he publicly condemned then Minister for Magic, Archer Evermonde, for prohibiting the magical community from helping Muggles waging the First World War. Henry's son, Fleamont Potter, who was given his grandmother's surname as his given name in order to grant the dying wish of Henry's mother to continue her family name, garnered a reputation for his duels at Hogwarts, which were provoked when others mocked him for his name. Fleamont quadrupled the family gold by creating magical Sleekeazy's Hair Potion, selling his company at a vast profit when he retired. Fleamont and his wife, Euphemia, had given up hope of having a child when she became pregnant with their son, James, who would go on to marry Lily Evans and bear a son of their own, Harry Potter. Fleamont and Euphemia lived to see James and Lily marry, but they would never meet their famous grandson, as they both died of dragon pox, stemming from their advanced age.

Reception

In 2002, Harry Potter was voted No. 85 among the "100 Best Fictional Characters" by Book magazine and also voted the 35th "Worst Briton" in Channel 4's "100 Worst Britons We Love to Hate" programme. Entertainment Weekly ranked Harry Potter number two on its 2010 "100 Greatest Characters of the Last 20 Years" list, saying "Long after we've turned the last page and watched the last end credit, Harry still feels like someone we know. And that's the most magical thing about him." UGO Networks listed Harry as one of their best heroes of all time, who said that "Harry is a hero to the often oppressed and downtrodden young fan boys and girls out there, who finally have an icon that is respected and revered by those who might otherwise look down on robe-wearing and wand waving as dork fodder". Harry Potter was also ranked number thirty-six on Empire 2008 list of "100 Greatest Movie Characters of All Time". IGN said that Harry Potter was their favourite Harry Potter character, calling him a "sympathetic figure" and saying in response to his fights against Voldemort that "everybody loves an underdog story of good vs. evil".

On the other hand, he has received criticism. In The Irish Times, Ed Power wrote "Potter, by contrast, is an anointed cherub, told he is special from the very outset. He has no winning attributes yet ... is fawned over endlessly. Harry is thus the ultimate 'Special One' – celebrated as an overachiever before he's achieved anything. ... In Potter, [Rowling] encourages the underage reader to identify with a young man who is exceptional only because the author insists this to be the case. You're extraordinary no matter what. Is that an outlook I want to pass onto my kids?" Author Lannah Marshall criticised the character, saying "What I hear about Harry Potter, more often than not, is that he is a bland character. Defence of this includes that he is an audience surrogate, or what I call a 'puppet protagonist'. A puppet protagonist is a main character with dull, limited personality, enabling the audience to step inside the role and use their imagination to fill in the rest. The prevalence of first-person narration within Young Adult (YA) simply adds to the tide of puppet protagonists; introducing hundreds of bland, forgetful leads into interesting and complex stories to allow the reader to feel part of the tale. It's like we’re going back to the second-person horrors of choose-your-own-adventure books."

Despite blowback from some Christian fundamentalists critical of Rowling's usage of witchcraft and magic in the series, other Christian critics, including Rev. John Killinger, have argued that Potter is a Christ figure in the series. Killinger opined in 2002 that "J.K. Rowling has written the Christ story of the 21st century, and it's wonderful that she has attained such a magnificent following worldwide." He noted several allusions to Jesus in Potter's character arcs in Philosopher's Stone and Chamber of Secrets. Rowling herself later admitted that the Gospel story inspired that of Harry Potter, especially with his ultimate sacrifice in Deathly Hallows and apparent death before returning to defeat Voldemort once and for all.

In popular culture

According to halloweenonline.com, Harry Potter sets were the fifth-best selling Halloween costume of 2005. In addition, wizard rock bands like Harry and the Potters and others regularly dress up in the style of Harry Potter, sporting painted forehead scars, black wigs, and round bottle top glasses. Wizard rock is a musical movement dating from 2002 that consists of at least 200 bands made up of young musicians, playing songs about Harry Potter. The movement started in Massachusetts with the band Harry and the Potters, who cosplay as Harry during live performances.

Parodies

In April 2009, a group of University of Michigan students eventually known as StarKid Productions performed Harry Potter: The Musical, a two-act musical parody that featured major elements from all seven books and an original score. They posted the entire musical on their YouTube channel but removed it in late June, to edit some more mature elements from the videos. The musical, re-titled A Very Potter Musical, was reposted on 5 July 2009, starring Darren Criss as Harry Potter. A sequel was premiered at the 2010 HPEF Harry Potter Conference Infinitus, and released on YouTube on 22 July at 8 pm EST. The sequel was called A Very Potter Sequel and featured the Death Eaters using the Time-Turner to go back in time to Harry's first year in Hogwarts. Harry Potter is spoofed in the Barry Trotter series by American writer Michael Gerber, where a "Barry Trotter" appears as the eponymous antihero. On his homepage, Gerber describes Trotter as an unpleasant character who "drinks too much, eats like a pig, sleeps until noon, and owes everybody money". The author stated "[s]ince I really liked Rowling's books ... I felt obligated to try to write a spoof worthy of the originals".

References

External links

 Harry Potter Bibliography: Research and Criticism
 Harry Potter on IMDb
 

Child characters in film
Child characters in literature
Child characters in musical theatre
Christ figures in fiction
Fictional characters who can turn invisible
Fictional child soldiers
Fictional English people
Fictional members of secret societies
Fictional war veterans
Fictional wizards
Harry Potter characters
Literary characters introduced in 1997
Male characters in film
Male characters in literature
Orphan characters in film
Orphan characters in literature
Teenage characters in film
Teenage characters in literature
Teenage characters in musical theatre
Time travelers
de:Figuren der Harry-Potter-Romane#Harry Potter